Pont-Hwfa (also Pont Hwfa) is a village in the  community of Caergybi, Ynys Môn, Wales, which is 140.8 miles (226.6 km) from Cardiff and 227.5 miles (366.1 km) from London.

References

See also
List of localities in Wales by population

Villages in Anglesey